The Superleague Formula round Germany is a round of the Superleague Formula. In the 2008 edition at the Nürburgring, ex Formula One driver Robert Doornbos took his first Superleague Formula win, also taking A.C. Milan's first race victory. It was also the round where another Formula One driver Antônio Pizzonia made his Superleague Formula debut. In the events only other race, GP2 Series driver Yelmer Buurman took his and PSV Eindhovens first victory in Superleague Formula.

It has been confirmed that racing will return to Germany in 2010 with a round at the Nürburgring.

Winners

References

External links
 Superleague Formula Official Website
 V12 Racing: Independent Superleague Formula Fansite Magazine

Germany